Thomas Louis Tolles Jr. (born October 21, 1966) is an American professional golfer who has played on the PGA Tour, the Nationwide Tour, and the PGA Tour Champions.

Tolles was born in Ft. Myers, Florida. He has two Nationwide Tour victories and has finished runner-up in two PGA Tour events including the 1996 Players Championship. Tolles led by two strokes after three rounds but a final round 72 left him in a tie for second place, four behind Fred Couples.

Tolles had a pair of third-place finishes in major championships. He finished solo third at the 1997 Masters Tournament. This was the tournament that Tiger Woods won by 12 strokes for his first major victory. Tolles also finished tied for third at the 1996 PGA Championship.

Tolles finished T5 at the U.S. Open in 1997 and finished 1 spot out (11th) from making the 1997 U.S. Ryder Cup team.

Professional wins (2)

Nike Tour wins (2)

Ben Hogan Tour playoff record (0–1)

Results in major championships

WD  = withdrew from tournament
CUT = missed the half-way cut
"T" = tied

Results in The Players Championship

CUT = missed the halfway cut
"T" indicates a tie for a place

See also
1994 PGA Tour Qualifying School graduates
2000 PGA Tour Qualifying School graduates
2003 Nationwide Tour graduates

References

External links

American male golfers
Georgia Bulldogs men's golfers
PGA Tour golfers
PGA Tour Champions golfers
Korn Ferry Tour graduates
Golfers from Florida
Sportspeople from Fort Myers, Florida
1966 births
Living people